A voluntary controlled school (VC school) is a state-funded school in England and Wales in which a foundation or trust (usually a Christian denomination) has some formal influence in the running of the school.  Such schools have less autonomy than voluntary aided schools, in which the foundation pays part of any building costs.

Characteristics 
Voluntary controlled schools are a kind of "maintained school", meaning that they are funded by central government via the local authority, and do not charge fees to students. The majority are also faith schools.

The land and buildings are typically owned by a charitable foundation, which also appoints about a quarter of the school governors.
However, the local authority employs the school's staff and has primary responsibility for the school's admission arrangements. Specific exemptions from Section 85 of the Equality Act 2010 enables VC faith schools to use faith criteria in prioritising pupils for admission to the schools.

Pupils at voluntary controlled schools follow the National Curriculum.

History 
Prior to the Education Act 1944, voluntary schools were those associated with a foundation, usually a religious group. That Act imposed higher standards on school facilities, and offered voluntary schools a choice in funding the costs this would incur.

 Voluntary controlled schools would have all their costs met by the state, but would be controlled by the local education authority.
 Voluntary aided schools would have all of their running costs met by the State, but their capital costs would only be partially state funded, with the foundation retaining greater influence over the school.

The Roman Catholic Church chose to retain control of its schools, while more than half of Church of England schools became voluntary controlled.

By 2008, in England, approximately 15% of primary schools were voluntary controlled, almost all of them associated with the Church of England.  Only 3% of secondary schools were voluntary controlled, of which about half were Church of England schools.

In 2012, the Fair Admissions Campaign began to encourage local authorities to stop using faith criteria in admissions policies for VC schools.

See also
 Voluntary aided school
State-funded schools (England)
Education in Wales
Education in Northern Ireland

References 

 
State schools in the United Kingdom
Voluntary controlled
Education in England
Education in Northern Ireland
Education in Wales
Education finance in the United Kingdom
Public education in the United Kingdom
Religious schools in the United Kingdom
Schools in England
Schools in Northern Ireland
Schools in Wales